Agapanthia alternans is a species of beetle in the family Cerambycidae. It was described by Gotthelf Fischer von Waldheim in 1842.

References

alternans
Beetles described in 1842